The Scotland Acts are a set of Acts of Parliament in the United Kingdom which relate to the creation and devolution of powers to the Scottish Parliament.

The term Scotland Act may refer to:

 Scotland Act 1978, part of an initial attempt at a devolved Scotland (repealed 1979)
 Scotland Act 1998, which formed the devolved Scottish Parliament
 Scotland Act 2012, which devolved further powers (primarily relating to taxation)
 Scotland Act 2016, which devolved a number of transport- and finance-related powers

See also

Scottish devolution commissions 
 Kilbrandon Commission, for the 1978 and 1998 Acts
 Calman Commission, for the 2012 Act
 Smith Commission, for the 2016 Act

Other United Kingdom devolution Acts 
 Northern Ireland Act, for Acts devolving powers to the Northern Ireland Assembly
 Government of Wales Act (disambiguation), for Acts devolving powers to the National Assembly for Wales